Senufo may refer to:
Senufo people
the Senufo family of languages
Ceremonial Drum of the Senufo People

See also
 Senufo Bird, a type of hat